High School Musical 3: Senior Year is the soundtrack to the 2008 Walt Disney Pictures film of the same name. It was released on October 21, 2008, in the United States.

Album information
The album sold 297,000 copies in the first week of sales on United States, debuting at number 2 on Billboard 200, losing the top to AC/DC's Black Ice. The album sold over 1.3 million copies in the U.S. and 3,500,000 copies worldwide. In Australia, the soundtrack was accredited Gold on November 6 (within the first week of its release), and was certified Platinum on December 2 - before the film even opened in cinemas across Australia. In Brazil, the album sold more than 60,000 in pre-orders alone and was certified Platinum before the official release. It also sold 97,972 in its first week in the UK, making it the Fastest-Selling Soundtrack Album in the UK.

A two-disc Premiere Edition version of the soundtrack was released on the same day as the standard version. The two-disc soundtrack features the original soundtrack and a DVD with video bonus features. The Premiere Edition was released in a digipak format in selected countries. On October 15, 2008, the 12-track digital version was officially sold on EOLAsia.com in Hong Kong. On October 18, 2008, Radio Disney hosted the Planet Premiere of the original soundtrack and played it on the air in its entirety.

Critical reception

Track listing

2-Disc Premiere edition
On the same day the soundtrack was released, Walt Disney Records released High School Musical 3: Senior Year 2-Disc Premiere edition Soundtrack, a special two-disc set of the High School Musical 3: Senior Year soundtrack. It is only available for a limited time at participating stores (i.e. Target, Wal-Mart, Costco).

 Disc 1 - High School Musical 3: Senior Year Soundtrack
 Disc 2 - Bonus DVD with the following:
 "Making of a Musical: From the Recording Studio to the Big Screen"
 "Now or Never" Music Video
 Official Movie Trailer(Running Time: 40 minutes)
 Special white package with special insert lyric booklet

Bonus tracks

On iTunes UK a new version of the soundtrack featuring remixes was released to coincide with the films DVD release.

2-disc collector's edition
For a limited time, Wal-Mart retailer stores only released an exclusive two-disc collector's edition of High School Musical 3: Senior Year. It included the soundtrack and the bonus DVD. The collector's edition is now available in the Philppness on the same release date of Sharpay's Fabulous Adventure after Universal Music Limited became the newest licensee of Walt Disney Records in the said country. It includes:

Songs from the movie scenes

There are some untitled tracks.

Singles
Multiple singles were released prior the release of the soundtrack album, with the song being released on digital stores and the music video being played on Disney Channel.

"Now or Never" was the first single released from the soundtrack and is performed by the Cast of 
High School Musical 3: Senior Year.

"I Want It All" was the second single released from the soundtrack and is performed by Ashley Tisdale and Lucas Grabeel as Sharpay Evans and Ryan Evans.

"A Night to Remember" was the third single released from the soundtrack and is performed by the cast of High School Musical 3: Senior Year.

"Right Here Right Now" was the fourth single released from the soundtrack and is performed by Zac Efron and Vanessa Hudgens as Troy Bolton and Gabriella Montez.

"The Boys Are Back" is a song by Troy Bolton (Zac Efron) and Chad Danforth (Corbin Bleu).

Music Video
The video shows that the member were wearing hoodies of the movies' basketball team. The video shows when the group sings and dances, there were scenes of the movie appearing in the video.

Chart Listing

Charts performance 
The album sold 297,000 copies in its first week in the United States, debuting at number 2 on Billboard 200. It has currently sold over 1 million copies in the U.S. In Australia, the soundtrack was accredited Gold on 6 November (within the first week of its release) but in Portugal, the soundtrack was accredited Platinum. The album had sold 3,500,000 copies worldwide as of March 2, 2010

Charts

Weekly charts

Year-end charts

Certifications and sales

International versions

International versions with foreign language lyrics have been released in various countries for the original single Right Here, Right Now, as well as international versions of "Just Wanna Be With You", "Scream", and "Walk Away". International versions of the entire album were produced in India, Turkey and Russia.

Hindi versions

Personnel
The following people contributed to the album:
 Vocals – Zac Efron, Vanessa Hudgens, Ashley Tisdale, Lucas Grabeel, Corbin Bleu, Monique Coleman, Olesya Rulin, Jemma McKenzie-Brown, Matt Prokop
 Executive Producers – Kenny Ortega, Bill Borden and Barry Rosenbush
 Producers – Adam Anders, Rasmus Billie Bähncke, Andy Dodd, Matthew Gerrard, Jamie Houston, Randy Petersen, Kevin Quinn, Adam Watts
 Lyricists - Adam Anders, Andy Dodd, Matthew Gerrard, Nikki Hassman, Jamie Houston, Robbie Nevil, Randy Petersen, Kevin Quinn, Adam Watts
 Mastering – Patricia Sullivan
 Engineers – Cary Butler, Matthew Gerrard, Jamie Houston, Jeremy Luzier, Joseph Magee, Brian Matouf, Joel Soyffer

See also
High School Musical
High School Musical 2
High School Musical 3: Senior Year
High School Musical: El desafio (Argentina)

References

External links

 Walt Disney Records Official Site
 Official album information
 Official film site
 Radio Disney Planet Premiere
 Official Portugal album information

Albums produced by Matthew Gerrard
Albums produced by Rock Mafia
Disney film soundtracks
High School Musical albums
2008 soundtrack albums
2000s film soundtrack albums
Walt Disney Records soundtracks
Cast recordings